Abhimanyu Mishra (born February 5, 2009) is an American chess grandmaster. A chess prodigy, he became the youngest player ever to qualify for the grandmaster title on June 30, 2021, at the age of 12 years 4 months and 25 days, beating Sergey Karjakin's record which had stood since 2002.

Career
He broke the United States Chess Federation record for youngest Expert by earning a 2000 USCF rating at the age of 7 years, 6 months, and 22 days, breaking the record of Awonder Liang.  He then broke the US Chess record for youngest National Master by earning a 2200 USCF rating at the age of 9 years, 2 months, and 17 days, breaking the record of Liran Zhou. He holds the world record for the youngest International Master, a title which he earned in November 2019 at the age of 10 years, 9 months, and 20 days, breaking the record of Rameshbabu Praggnanandhaa. FIDE awarded him the title in February 2020.

In March 2021, Mishra tied for first place with GM Vladimir Belous in the Charlotte Chess Center's Spring 2021 GM Norm Invitational held in Charlotte, North Carolina, U.S., with a score of 5.5/9 and crossed 2400 FIDE for the first time on an official rating list but failed to achieve a GM norm.

To become a grandmaster, a player must score three GM norms (each norm is scored by achieving a performance rating of over 2600 in a tournament) and exceed a rating of 2500. In April 2021, Mishra tied for first place at the Vezérképző GM tournament in Budapest, Hungary, with a score of 7.0/9 and performance rating of 2603, earning his first GM norm. In May 2021, Mishra earned clear first place at the First Saturday GM tournament in Budapest, Hungary, with a score of 8.0/9 and performance rating of 2739, having clinched his second GM norm with one round to spare and exceeding the norm by a full point. In June 2021, Mishra earned clear first place at the Vezérképző GM Mix tournament in Budapest, Hungary, with a score of 7.0/9 and a performance rating of 2619; giving him his third GM norm. As his rating had also crossed 2500, this third norm made Mishra the youngest Grandmaster in chess history, breaking the record of Sergey Karjakin by over 2 months.

Mishra received congratulations from many players, including former record holder Karjakin and World Champion Magnus Carlsen. A New York Times article cited concerns from Nigel Short and Bruce Pandolfini about the methods used to achieve the feat, alleging that the GM qualification structure encourages "norm" tournaments that narrowly qualify as prestigious enough to count as a GM norm, but no tougher, to make a strong performance from the candidate easier to achieve, noting that the average rating of Mishra's opponents' was noticeably lower in Hungary than in Charlotte, North Carolina. World Championship challenger Ian Nepomniachtchi suggested that some changes could be made to the qualification process. In 2022 FIDE updated the rules regarding titled norms, imposing that at least one norm be obtained at a Swiss tournament with at least 40 participants of an average rating of 2000 and above.

Mishra played in the 2021 Chess World Cup, losing to Baadur Jobava in the first round.

Mishra won the St. Louis 2022 Spring Chess Classic B with a score of 7/9 and a tournament performance rating of 2739.

References

External links
 
 
 
 

2009 births
Living people
American chess players
Chess grandmasters
Place of birth missing (living people)
American people of South Asian descent